Heart of the Country is a 2013 American drama film written and directed by John Ward and starring Jana Kramer and Gerald McRaney. When a wealthy New York socialites’ world is in upheaval, she’ll need to lean on the family and southern roots she left long ago. It is based on a novel by Ward and Rene Gutteridge.

Plot

Cast
Jana Kramer as Faith
Gerald McRaney as Calvin
Randy Wayne as Luke
Shaun Sipos as Lee
Anne Hawthorne as Olivia

Production
The film was shot in Wilmington, North Carolina.

Reception
Tracy Moore of Common Sense Media awarded the film three stars out of five.

References

External links
 
 

American drama films
Films based on American novels
Films shot in North Carolina
2013 drama films
2013 films
2010s English-language films
2010s American films